Clarendon Hills is a village in DuPage County, Illinois, United States.

Clarendon Hills or Clarendon Hill may also refer to:

 Clarendon Hills (wine), an Australian winery in McLaren Vale, Southern Australia
 Clarendon Hills (Metra), is a metra station in Clarendon Hills, Illinois
 Clarendon Hill, a hill in  Somerville, Massachusetts, location of Teele Square